This is a list of political groups by country. A political group also known as a political alliance, coalition or bloc, is cooperation by members of different political parties on a common agenda of some kind. This usually involves formal agreements between two or more entire parties. A political group is usually especially beneficial to the parties concerned during and immediately after elections – due to characteristics of the electoral systems concerned (e.g. allowing each party to clear electoral thresholds) and/or allowing parties to participate in formation of a government after elections. These may break up quickly, or hold together for decades becoming the de facto norm, operating almost as a single unit. Political group may also form prior to elections in an effort to reduce uncertainty following the election.

Coalition governments are formed when a political group comes to power, or when only a plurality (not a majority) has been reached and several parties must work together to govern. One of the peculiarities of such a method of governance results in minister without portfolio.

Political groups by country

Active political groups
Argentina: Frente de Todos, Juntos por el Cambio, Workers' Left Front – Unity
Armenia: Civil Contract, United Labour Party
Australia: Liberal/National Coalition
Bolivia: Civic Community, Creemos
Bulgaria: BSP for Bulgaria, Democratic Bulgaria, There Is Such a People, We Continue the Change
Chile: Chile Vamos, New Deal, Apruebo Dignidad, Broad Front, Chile Digno, Christian Social Front, United Independents
Croatia: Restart Coalition
Czech Republic: Pirates and Mayors, SPOLU
European Parliament: EPP, S&D, Renew, Greens-EFA, ID, ECR, The Left
Germany: Christian Democratic Union/Christian Social Union
Gibraltar: GSLP–Liberal Alliance
Greece: Movement for Change
Hong Kong: Pan-democracy camp, Pro-Beijing camp, Localist Groups
Hungary: Fidesz-KDNP, United for Hungary
India: National Democratic Alliance (NDA), United Progressive Alliance (UPA), Left Front
Ireland: Solidarity–People Before Profit, Fianna Fáil–SDLP
Italy: Centre-left coalition, Centre-right coalition, Free and Equal, Civic Commitment, Greens and Left Alliance
Latvia: Union of Greens and Farmers
Lebanon: March 8 Alliance, March 14 Alliance
Malaysia: Alliance of Hope (PH), Barisan Nasional (BN), Perikatan Nasional (PN), Gabungan Rakyat Sabah Party (GRS), Gabungan Parti Sarawak (GPS)
Mexico: Juntos Hacemos Historia, Va por México
Philippines: Coalition for Change, Bagong Alyansang Makabayan
Poland: United Right, The Left, Polish Coalition, Civic Coalition, Confederation Liberty and Independence
Portugal: Unitary Democratic Coalition
Romania: USR PLUS, National Identity Bloc in Europe
Russia: All-Russia People's Front
Serbia: For Our Children, United Serbia (coalition)
Spain: Unidas Podemos, EH Bildu
Sweden: Red-Greens
Switzerland: Swiss People's Party group 
Republic of China/Taiwan: Pan-Blue Coalition, Pan-Green Coalition
Tunisia: Popular Front
Turkey: People's Alliance, Nation Alliance, Labour and Freedom Alliance
United Kingdom: Labour and Co-operative
Uruguay: Broad Front
Venezuela: Great Patriotic Pole, Democratic Unity Roundtable

Defunct political groups
Argentina: Alliance for Work, Justice and Education, Broad Progressive Front
Armenia: My Step Alliance, Way Out Alliance, We Alliance, Bright Alliance, ORO Alliance
Brazil: With the Strength of the People
Bulgaria: United Patriots
Chile: Alliance for Chile, Concert of Parties for Democracy, Coalition for Change, Juntos Podemos Más
France: Union for French Democracy, Federation of the Democratic and Socialist Left, Left Front
Germany: WASG–PDS, Harzburg Front
Greece: Coalition of the Radical Left
Hungary: Unity (Hungary)
India: Third Front
Israel: Alignment, Gahal, One Israel, National Union, Likud Yisrael Beiteinu, Zionist Union, Yesh Atid–Telem
Italy: Pole for Freedoms, House of Freedoms, The Olive Tree, The Union, Italy. Common Good
South Korea: Forward and Creative, Peace and Justice
Latvia: Harmony Centre
Mauritius: Alliance Sociale
Malaysia: Barisan Alternatif, Pakatan Rakyat
Mexico: Broad Progressive Front
Moldova: Alliance for Democracy and Reforms, Alliance for European Integration, Now Platform
Montenegro: European Montenegro, Together for Change, Serb List
New Zealand: United–Reform Coalition, Alliance
Philippines: United Opposition, Team PNoy, Koalisyon ng Daang Matuwid, Coalition for Change, United Nationalist Alliance (became political party in 2015)
Poland: Solidarity Electoral Action, Left and Democrats, United Left, European Coalition
Portugal: Democratic Alliance, Portugal Ahead
Romania: Social Democratic Pole, Justice and Truth Alliance, Social Liberal Union
Russia: The Other Russia
Serbia: Democratic Opposition of Serbia
Slovenia: Democratic Opposition of Slovenia
Spain: Convergence and Union, Junts pel Sí
Sweden: Alliance
Ukraine: Yulia Tymoshenko Bloc, Our Ukraine–People's Self-Defense Bloc
United Kingdom: SDP–Liberal Alliance, Conservative–DUP agreement, Ulster Conservatives and Unionists

See also
Coalition government
Electoral alliance
Popular front
Red–green alliance
United front
Umbrella organization
Alliance
Coalition

References 

 
Political science terminology